The Atlantic Northeast is a geographic and cultural region of eastern North America bounded by the Atlantic Ocean to the east and (loosely) by the Saint Lawrence River to the northwest. Though no official boundary exists, the most common conception includes the Maritime provinces, southern Quebec, and the island of Newfoundland in Canada, and the New England region of the United States. Broader conceptions reach further north into Canada, including Labrador and the Côte-Nord region of Quebec. Narrower conceptions may be limited to the coastal areas east of the Appalachian Mountains. The variety of definitions can be attributed to overlapping commonalities of the region's history, culture, geography, ecology, society, and other factors.

Definition

The term "Atlantic Northeast" should not be confused with Atlantic Canada, which includes the entirety of New Brunswick, Newfoundland and Labrador, Nova Scotia, and Prince Edward Island, but excludes Quebec. It should also not be confused with the northeastern portion of the Atlantic Ocean.

History
The predominant nations in the region over the course of the estimated last 11,000 years have been the Abenaki, Penobscot, Mi'kmaq, Maliseet, and Passamaquoddy, all of whom were later associated with the Wabanaki Confederacy. These nations' countries mainly overlapped the soon-to-be Maritime provinces, such as Mi'kma'ki and Wolastokuk with New Brunswick, Nova Scotia, and Prince Edward Island, as well as Ndakinna, Peskotomuhkatik, and Pαnawαhpskewahki with Vermont, New Hampshire, and Massachusetts.

Before 1620 the conflicts between First Nations and English settlers started due to the alienation of tribes; they also kidnapped members of the tribes through violence. The violence confused many Indigenous nations because they also traded with proper settlers, but this left the First Nations resentful of the European nations.The presence of the French and English in the Atlantic Northeast attracted the Dutch to begin trading on the Hudson River with different peoples. The new presence of these traders also brought unwanted microbes, viruses, and bacteria that took a disastrous toll on the Indigenous populations. When smallpox swept the New England area in 1610, the native population hit an all-time low, since they were trying to fight off a virus that was not indigenous to the area. Eventually the population recovered but not completely. After the outbreak settlers became highly interested in the Wabanaki beaver pelts, which they would trade for glass, metal, and weapons.

During the period of the expulsion of the Acadians, thousands were deported from the present-day Canadian provinces of Nova Scotia, New Brunswick, and PEI, as well as from northern Maine — parts of the French region called Acadie — into the Thirteen Colonies, from 1755 until 1758. Large parts of Nova Scotia were subsequently resettled by new arrivals from New England before 1775. At the end of the American Revolution, nearly 75,000 Loyalists resettled in Nova Scotia, New Brunswick and Québec. Close to 3,500 free African Americans went to Nova Scotia. Before 1860, about 30,000–40,000 black people entered Canada, many of them joining the previous group in Nova Scotia, either free or as escaped slaves through the Underground Railroad. From the mid-19th century until the Great Depression in the 1930s, nearly 900,000 French Canadians emigrated from Québec to the U.S. Two-thirds went into New England mill towns.

Geography 
Major geographical features of the Atlantic Northeast include the Appalachian Mountains, the Green Mountains, the Atlantic Ocean, Long Island Sound, the Gulf of Maine, the Gulf of Saint Lawrence, the Bay of Fundy, the Merrimack River, the Boston Harbor, the Taunton River, the Blackstone River, the Connecticut River, the Housatonic River, and the Hoosic River.

Border disputes
The "Gray Zone" is an area of land and sea which is claimed by both Canada and the United States. It is located off the coasts of New Brunswick and Maine. The only land within this area are two islands, Machias Seal Island and North Rock. The "Gray Zone" is one of four areas between the two countries whose sovereignty is still in dispute, but is the only one of the disputed areas containing land. In 1979, both countries filed a joint application to the International Court of Justice to avoid having the dispute settled when oceanic boundaries in the area were set for mineral and fishing rights. Canadians have had a continuous presence in the area since 1832 when a lighthouse was built.

Places of interest 

This monument is home to many marine species, fish, whales, and dolphins. The monument was formed by a declaration by President Barack Obama.

Salem, Massachusetts, is a famous location in New England known primarily for the Salem witch trials. It was also one of Massachusetts' wealthiest ports for trading in the late 18th century.

The park is home to Cadillac Mountain, the highest mountain on the east coast of the United States.

Climate 
The Atlantic Northeast region has a four-season climate. The Canadian Maritimes have seasons very similar to the New England areas.

Demographics 
Most of the region's population is concentrated in southwestern New England and the Saint Lawrence Lowlands of Quebec, both of which form the northern part of their respective country's largest megalopolises. The region's largest metropolitan areas are Greater Boston, Massachusetts, with 4.8 million people; Greater Montreal, Quebec, with 4.1 million people; Greater Providence, Rhode Island, with 1.62 million people; and Greater Hartford, Connecticut, with 1.21 million people.

Largest cities and metropolitan areas
This is a list of the most populous cities and metropolitan areas in the Atlantic Northeast based on the 2016 Canadian Census and United States Census Bureau population estimates as of July 1, 2019.

Notes

Culture

Sports

Historical landmarks 
Alexander Graham Bell National Historic Site in Baddeck, Cape Breton Island, Nova Scotia, commemorates Alexander Graham Bell, a remarkable inventor who created Canada's first engine-powered airplane, the world's fastest boat, and the world's first telephone, along with many other achievements.

Halifax Citadel National Historic Site is the site of Fort George in Halifax, Nova Scotia. Visitors can take tours of the fort, learning about its soldiers, its legends and ghost stories, and even become a soldier for the day.

The Freedom Trail is a two and a half mile walking trail through the city of Boston that takes visitors past sixteen historic sites that led to the American Revolution, including the Boston Common, the Park Street Church, the Granary Burying Ground, King's Chapel, the Old Corner Bookstore, the Old State House, the site of the Boston Massacre, Faneuil Hall, the Paul Revere House, the Old North Church, the USS Constitution, and the Bunker Hill Monument.

The Salem Witch Museum describes the history of the Salem witch trials of 1692 through life-size figures and narrations.

The First Baptist Church in America was founded in Providence, Rhode Island, in 1638 by William Vincent Carpenter and Roger Williams and was later rebuilt in 1774. Guided tours are available from Memorial Day through Labor Day on weekdays, and self tours of the landmark are available all year round.

The Lake Champlain Maritime Museum, in Vergennes, Vermont, open from May to October, houses historic schooners, steamboats, wooden boats, shipwrecks, and even a Revolutionary War gunboat replica. Visitors can learn about the history of the lake's role in commerce, communication, transportation, and war, as well as its natural history above and below sea level.

Charlottetown City Hall is the oldest municipal building on Prince Edward Island, built in 1888. Visitors can tour the City Hall to learn about the history and present day of Prince Edward Island and the city of Charlottetown.

Education in Maritime 
The Maritime Province Higher Education Committee is responsible for administering and assisting post-secondary education systems within the Canadian part of the region. They also help with institution and government programs to educate people with a better learning environment. 
Nova Scotia
Nova Scotia Community College
McKenzie College
Kingston Bible College
Gaelic College
Canadian Coast Guard College
New Brunswick 
New Brunswick Community College
New Brunswick Bible Institute
Maritime College of Forest Technology
Collège communautaire du Nouveau-Brunswick
Prince Edward island
Maritime Christian College
Collège de l'Île
Holland College

Economy 

New England economy shows continuous growth in the second quarter of 2016.  The unemployment rate is 4.4 percent which is a .6 drop from last years census in 2015. From 2015 to 2016 the job that had the most growth in a year was construction. The manufacturing nationally decreased from two thousand fifteen to two thousand and sixteen but the New England area had a nice increase.

Employment rate - Job growth in the New England states hit a growth rate of two point one percent which is an increase from last year.

Unemployment rate 
Rhode Island - 17%

Connecticut - 7.9%

Massachusetts - 15.1%

New Hampshire - 16.7%

Maine - 10.6%

Vermont -  15.6%

Home prices 
Home prices have raised nationally and regionally year-over-year house prices have all been positively marked up.  However Massachusetts had the best house price gains out of the whole New England area which was a 5.2 percent mark up.

House price index 
Massachusetts - five percent increase

New Hampshire - four percent increase

Maine - three percent increase

Vermont - two percent increase

Transportation

Wildlife

Birds 

In the Atlantic Northeast it is common to see many birds living in the region, including bald eagles (Haliaeetus leucocephalus), piping plovers (Atlantic coast) (Charadrius melodus), the red-cockaded woodpecker (Picoides borealis), the red knot (Calidris canutus rufa), the North American subspecies of the roseate tern (Sterna dougallii dougallii), and shorebirds.

Aquatic life 

The aquatic life in the Atlantic Northeast is quite extensive. The more common animals that are found in the area include the American eel (Anguilla rostrata), Appalachian monkey-face pearly mussel (Theliderma sparsa), dwarf wedgemussel (Alasmidonta heterodon), Atlantic horseshoe crab (Limulus polyphemus), Kenk's amphipod (Stygobromus kenki), and northern red-bellied cooter (Pseudemys rubriventris).

Plants 

The plant life in the Atlantic Northeast is quite varied due to the turbulent climate in that area, but some of the more common plant life includes such species as Furbish lousewort (Pedicularis furbishiae), Jesup's milk-vetch (Astragalus robbinsii var. jesupii), and Northeastern bulrush (Scirpus ancistrochaetus).

See also
 Acadia
 Northeastern United States
 The Maritimes
 New England
 Atlantic Canada
 New England Governors and Eastern Canadian Premiers' Annual Conference

References 

Geography of New England
Geography of the Maritimes
Geography of the United States
Geography of Canada
Geography of Connecticut
Geography of New Hampshire
Geography of New York (state)
Geography of Rhode Island
Geography of Vermont
Geography of Maine
Geography of Quebec
Geography of Nova Scotia
Geography of New Brunswick
Geography of Prince Edward Island
Geography of Newfoundland and Labrador